Dark Shadows: Kingdom of the Dead is a Big Finish Productions audio drama based on the long-running American horror soap opera series Dark Shadows.

Cast 
David Selby – Quentin Collins
Lara Parker – Angelique Bouchard Collins
Kathryn Leigh Scott – Maggie Evans
John Karlen – Willie Loomis
Jerry Lacy – Reverend
Andrew Collins – Barnabas Collins
David Warner – Seraph
Ursula Burton – Susan Griffin
Jamison Selby – Ed Griffin
Lysette Anthony – Doctor Rankin
Alec Newman – Orderly
James Storm – Sheriff Haggerty
Nancy Barrett – Carolyn Stoddard
Marie Wallace – Mrs Griffin
Lizzie Hopley – Street Walker
Richard Halpern – Announcer
Eric Wallace – Conductor

External links 
Dark Shadows - 2.0 Kingdom Of The Dead Box Set

Kingdom of the Dead
2010 audio plays